Dariusz Koszykowski (born January 22, 1972) is a Polish sprint canoer who competed in the early to mid-1990s. He won a bronze medal in the C-2 1000 m event at the 1994 ICF Canoe Sprint World Championships in Mexico City.

Koszykowski also competed in two Summer Olympics, earning his best finish of fourth in the C-2 1000 m semifinal round at Barcelona in 1992. He did not advance to the final round in either Olympics.

References

Sports-reference.com profile

1972 births
Canoeists at the 1992 Summer Olympics
Canoeists at the 1996 Summer Olympics
Living people
Olympic canoeists of Poland
Polish male canoeists
People from Gryfino County
ICF Canoe Sprint World Championships medalists in Canadian
Sportspeople from West Pomeranian Voivodeship